The Brown Bears represented Brown University in ECAC women's ice hockey during the 2015–16 NCAA Division I women's ice hockey season.  They were led by new head coach, Bob Kenneally.

Offseason

April 1: Robert Kennelley, a former men's hockey player for Brown (class of 1990), was named head coach.  Kenneally had been the Executive Associate for Brown Athletics prior to assuming his new role.

Recruiting

Roster

Schedule

|-
!colspan=12 style="background:#381C00; color:white;"| Regular Season

References

Brown
2015 in sports in Rhode Island
2016 in sports in Rhode Island
Brown Bears women's ice hockey seasons